Wolf Creek is a stream in Hickman County, Tennessee, in the United States. It is a tributary of Duck River.

Wolf Creek was so named from the numerous wolves seen near it by pioneer settlers.

See also
List of rivers of Tennessee

References

Rivers of Hickman County, Tennessee
Rivers of Tennessee